57 Cancri is a double star in the zodiac constellation of Cancer, located around 460 light years away from the Sun. They are visible to the naked eye as a faint star with a combined apparent visual magnitude of +5.40. The brighter member, designated component A. is a yellow-hued giant star with a stellar classification of G7 III and an apparent magnitude of +6.09. Its companion, component B, is an orange-hued giant with a class of K0 III and an apparent magnitude of +6.37. As of 2017, the pair had an angular separation of  along a position angle of 310°.

References

G-type giants
K-type giants
Binary stars
Cancer (constellation)
Durchmusterung objects
Cancri, 57
043721
075959
3532